"Where Is My Man" is a song from 1983 by the American singer and actress Eartha Kitt, which appeared on her 1984 album I Love Men.
The song was co-written by comedy writer Bruce Vilanch along with musicians and producers Fred Zarr and Jacques Morali.

Release 
The song was first released in France as a single where it was wildly successful. The song features Kitt singing in a low, seductive-sounding voice. Included in the song are some sounds that have come to be associated with Kitt, including a purring sound similar to one she made while portraying Catwoman on the 1960s TV series Batman. The lyrics to the song detail specific things the singer expects to receive from her future lover, such as a trip to Saint-Tropez and shopping at Tiffany & Co.

Failures 
The title failed to find release in the United States until the producers' attorneys (the firm of Grubman, Indursky, Shindler) introduced the title to their client, New York based Streetwise Records. Streetwise Records released the title in late 1983 in the United States to the dance and club markets. It was Kitt's first recording released in the United States after she was ostracized and fled into self-imposed exile in Paris following her outspoken objection to the Vietnam War at a White House function in 1968. The song became her biggest-selling single in 30 years.

Charts 
In the United Kingdom, "Where Is My Man" reached the top 40 on the UK Singles Chart, where it peaked at number 36. This was her first UK Hit single in 28 years. The previous chart entry was "Under The Bridges of Paris", dating from 1955. The single was also a hit in dance clubs around the world, peaking at number 5 in Sweden and number 22 in Netherlands. In the U.S., the song made the top 10 on the Billboard Hot Dance Club Play chart, peaking at number 7 and remaining on the survey for 14 weeks.

References

External links
Single release info at discogs.com

1983 singles
Eartha Kitt songs
Disco songs
Songs written by Jacques Morali
Songs written by Fred Zarr
Songs written by Bruce Vilanch
1982 songs